is a city located in Yamanashi Prefecture, Japan. ,  the city had an estimated population of 31,526 in 13,147 households, and a population density of 120 persons per km². The city is the home of the indigenous Koshu grape and is synonymous with viticulture and wine production in Japan.

Geography
Kōshū is in northeastern Yamanashi Prefecture, occupying the eastern portion of the Kofu Basin.  Parts of the city are within the borders of the Chichibu-Tama-Kai National Park. The peak of Mount Daibosatsu, 2057 meters, is within the city limits.

Rivers
Fuefuki River
Omo River(Yamanashi)
Hi River

Neighboring municipalities
Yamanashi Prefecture
Yamanashi
Fuefuki
Ōtsuki
Kosuge
Tabayama
Saitama Prefecture
Chichibu

Climate
The city has a climate characterized by characterized by hot and humid summers, and relatively mild winters (Köppen climate classification Cfa).  The average annual temperature in Kōshū is 10.1 °C. The average annual rainfall is 1477 mm with September as the wettest month. The temperatures are highest on average in August, at around 22.5 °C, and lowest in January, at around -1.8 °C.

Demographics
Per Japanese census data, the population of Kōshū has declined in recent decades.

History
Kōshū is located near the center of ancient Kai Province and contains many ruins from the Jōmon period and burial mounds from the Kofun period. During the Heian period, the area was developed in shōen under control of the Minamoto clan, which devolved into feudal holdings by the Nikaido clan and later the Takeda clan from the Kamakura through Sengoku periods. During the Edo period, all of Kai Province was tenryō territory under direct control of the Tokugawa shogunate. Following the Meiji restoration, the area was organized into villages within Yamanashi District of Yamanashi Prefecture, which was later divided into Higashiyamanashi District and Nishiyamanashi District Many of these villages were consolidated into the city of Enzan, the town of Katsunuma, and the village of Yamato  by April 1, 1955. The modern city of Kōshū was established on November 1, 2005, from the merger of these three municipalities.

Government
Kōshū has a mayor-council form of government with a directly elected mayor and a unicameral city legislature of 18 members. The city supplies two members to the Yamanashi Prefectural Assembly.

Economy
Most of the area of the city is agricultural, and is especially known for its production of peaches, grapes and wine.

Education
Kōshū has 14 public elementary schools and six public junior high schools operated by the city government and one public high school operated by the Yamanashi Prefectural Board of Education. Then prefectural also operates the Yamanashi Industrial Technology Junior College.

Transportation

Railway
 East Japan Railway Company -  Chūō Main Line 
  -  –

Highway
  Chūō Expressway

Sister cities
 - Futtsu, Chiba – since December 1, 1977 with former Enzan City
 - Ames, Iowa, USA – since September 20, 1993 with former Enzan City
 - Beaune, Côte-d'Or, France – since September 18, 1976 with former Katsunuma City
 – Turpan, Xinjiang, China – since October 3, 2000 with former Katsunuma City

Local attractions

Places
 Katsunuma clan residence ruins, a National Historic Site
Daizen-ji, Buddhist temple with a Yakushi-do designated as a National Treasure 
Kaikinzan gold mines, Sengoku period mine and National Historic Site
Shakado Museum Of Jomon Culture
Mitake Shōsenkyō, River gorge and nationally designated Special Place of Scenic Beauty
Erin-ji, Buddhist temple with Japanese garden designed as a national Place of Scenic Beauty
Kōgaku-ji, Buddhist temple with Japanese garden designed as a national Place of Scenic Beauty

Events
Every year in autumn the "Koshu Fruit Marathon" is held. While it is called a "marathon" (the word is commonly used in Japan to describe races of varying distances) it actually consists of several shorter races, a 3.5 family race, a 10 km race, a half-marathon, and a 23 km race.

Notable people
Yoshio Tsuchiya, actor
Terutomo Yamazaki, karateka and kick boxer
Tomokazu Miura, actor
Eijun Kiyokumo, professional football player
Hiroko Nakamura, pianist

References

External links

  
Official Website 

 
Cities in Yamanashi Prefecture